The Streets of San Francisco is a television crime drama filmed on location in San Francisco and produced by Quinn Martin Productions, with the first season produced in association with Warner Bros. Television (QM produced the show on its own for the remainder of its run).

It starred Karl Malden and Michael Douglas as two homicide Inspectors in San Francisco. The show ran for five seasons, between 1972 and 1977, on ABC, amassing a total of 119 60-minute episodes. Douglas left the series at the start of its final season, and was replaced by Richard Hatch.

The series started with a pilot movie of the same title (based on the 1972 detective novel Poor, Poor Ophelia by Carolyn Weston) a week before the series debuted. Edward Hume, who wrote the teleplay for the pilot, was credited as having developed the series based on characters in Weston's novel. The pilot featured guest stars Robert Wagner, Tom Bosley, and Kim Darby.

Production

The Streets of San Francisco debuted on ABC on Saturday, September 16, 1972, at 9 pm Eastern, competing against the popular CBS sitcoms The Mary Tyler Moore Show and The Bob Newhart Show. After Streets gained attention on Saturday nights during the first season, the show was moved to Thursday, where it stayed for the remainder of its run, beginning with the second season, competing against other successful 1970s crime dramas, in different timeslots.

By all accounts, Malden and Douglas developed a strong professional and personal relationship from their time on the series. Twenty years after last working together on an episode, they were both onstage at the 1996 People's Choice Awards. Malden referred to Douglas as "the son I never had" and mentioned that he had wanted producer Quinn Martin to cast Douglas on the series. Douglas responded to the compliment by calling Malden "my mentor", and both expressed that they enjoyed working together on the show.

The show revolved around two police officers who investigated homicides in San Francisco. The center of the series was a veteran cop and widower, Lt. Michael Stone, star #897 (played by Malden), who had more than 20 years of police experience and was now assigned to the homicide detail of the San Francisco Police Department's Bureau of Inspectors. He was partnered with a young inspector and energetic partner, Assistant Inspector Steve Keller, star #2248 (played by Douglas), a college graduate, aged 28, who had little experience on the police force. Stone became a second father to Keller as he learned the rigors and procedures of detective work. Eventually, Keller was promoted to full inspector. As the series progressed, Douglas became a star in his own right. Mike's daughter, Jeannie Stone (Darleen Carr), made occasional appearances.

After the second episode of the fifth and final season, Douglas left the show after successfully producing the film One Flew Over the Cuckoo's Nest, which won the Academy Award for Best Film for 1975. He, in turn, also established a film career. His character's absence was explained by having him take a teaching position at UC Berkeley, a local college, while Lt. Stone was partnered with another Inspector, Inspector Dan Robbins (Hatch). Hatch started his career on the ABC soap All My Children and later went on to Battlestar Galactica. The change was not popular with audiences, and the show ended in 1977 due to declining ratings and increased production costs. Additionally in 1977, writer James J. Sweeney won an Edgar Award from the Mystery Writers of America for his teleplay for the season-four episode "Requiem for Murder".
The series was sponsored by Ford Motor Company, and half of the vehicles shown were new Ford cars. In the early episodes, Keller and Stone drove a brown 1971 Ford Galaxie four-door sedan and the entire SFPD cruiser fleet consists of Ford Galaxies.

On January 27, 1992, a reunion TV movie titled Back to the Streets of San Francisco was aired. Douglas did not appear. However, Darleen Carr did return as Mike Stone's daughter Jeannie.

Cast

 Karl Malden as Lt. Mike Stone
 Michael Douglas as Inspector Steve Keller (Seasons 1–4)
 Richard Hatch as Inspector Dan Robbins (Season 5)
 Darleen Carr as Jeannie Stone  
 Fred Sadoff as Dr. Lenny Murchison
 Lee Harris as Inspector Lee Lessing  (Season 1)
 Vic Tayback as Inspector Norm Haseejian (Season 1)
 Norman Alden as Inspector. Dan Healy (Season 1)
 Ray K. Goman as Officer Vic Briles (Season 1)
 Tim O'Connor - Lt/Capt. Roy Devitt (Seasons 1–3)
 Robert F. Simon  as Capt. Rudy Olson (Seasons 1–4)
 Hari Rhodes as Lab Technician Floyd Marsden (Seasons 1–4)
 Reuben Collins as Inspector Bill Tanner  (Seasons 2–5)
 John Kerr as D.A. Gerald O’Brien (Seasons 2–5)
 Art Passarella as Sgt. Art Sekulovich (Seasons 3–5; the character name was an in-joke, as "Sekulovich" was Karl Malden's real last name)
 Ward Costello as Capt. Roy Devitt (Season 5)

Guest stars

Many actors guest-starred on the show; some were relatively unknown at the time and became successful stars in their own feature films or television series. Among them:

 Luther Adler
 Charles Aidman
 Claude Akins
 Jack Albertson
 Richard Anderson
 Michael Ansara
 Desi Arnaz Jr.
 Lew Ayres
 Meredith Baxter
 Ned Beatty
 Noah Beery Jr.
 Cal Bellini
 Len Birman
 Bill Bixby
 Tom Bosley
 Richard Bull
 Dennis Cole
 Dabney Coleman
 Marshall Colt
 Michael Constantine
 Pat Conway
 Joseph Cotten
 Tyne Daly
 John Davidson
 Susan Dey
 Howard Duff
 Patty Duke
 Richard Eastham
 Richard Egan
 Sam Elliott
 Jamie Farr
 Norman Fell
 Victor French
 Anthony Geary
 Paul Michael Glaser
 Ron Glass
 Larry Hagman
 Mark Hamill
 Eileen Heckart
 Laurie Heineman
 Earl Holliman
 Celeste Holm
 Clint Howard
 Rodolfo Hoyos Jr.
 Herbert Jefferson Jr.
 Don Johnson
 Gordon Jump
 Don Keefer
 Paula Kelly
 Wright King
 Tommy Kirk
 Bernie Kopell
 Martin Kove
 Cheryl Ladd
 Roscoe Lee Browne
 Kay Lenz
 Geoffrey Lewis
 Gary Lockwood
 Flip Mark
 Nora Marlowe
 Nan Martin
 Wayne Maunder
 Maureen McCormick
 Gerald McRaney
 Eve McVeagh
 Vera Miles
 Vic Morrow
 Roger E. Mosley
 Edward Mulhare
 Ricky Nelson
 Leslie Nielsen
 Nick Nolte
 Edmond O'Brien
 Larry Pennell
 Stefanie Powers
 Denver Pyle
 Robert Reed
 John Ritter
 Doris Roberts
 Pernell Roberts
 Andrew Robinson
 Marion Ross
 Albert Salmi
 Joe Santos
 Dick Sargent
 John Saxon
 Arnold Schwarzenegger
 Tom Selleck
 Martin Sheen
 Paul Sorvino
 David Soul
 Dean Stockwell
 Brenda Vaccaro
 Dick Van Patten
 Robert Wagner
 Jessica Walter
 Beverly Washburn
 David Wayne
 Carl Weathers
 David White
 Stuart Whitman
 Van Williams
 William Windom
 James Woods
 Tony Young

Michael Douglas's mother Diana Douglas guest-starred in the season two episode "Chapel of the Damned". Gary Vinson appeared toward the end of his career.

Broadcast history

Sep 1972 – Jan 1973:	Sat at	9:00–10:00 ET
Jan 1973 – Aug 1974:	Thu at	10:00–11:00 ET
Sep 1974 – Sep 1976:	Thu at	9:00–10:00 ET
Sep 1976 – Jun 1977:	Thu at	10:00–11:00 ET

When the series debuted, it was slotted as counter programming opposite CBS' popular Saturday-night situation comedies, but failed to build an audience. The two-hour pilot movie ranked 58 out of 65 programs telecast that week, while the first regular episode of the series fared even lower at 62nd of 65 programs. In January 1973, ABC shook up its lineup by shuffling a number of its programs around. The Streets of San Francisco moved to Thursday night, and immediately increased its viewership to an 18.1 rating and 31 percent share of the audience. Over the next three years, the series flourished on Thursday, ranking number 22 for its second and third seasons and number 26 for its fourth. For the 1976-77 television season, ABC made the strategic error of moving the show up one hour, placing it in direct competition with Barnaby Jones, another Quinn Martin Production. The two crime dramas virtually split their audience with Barnaby Jones ranking 49th and The Streets of San Francisco falling to 52nd of 104 shows for the season. The decline in viewership, coupled with steadily rising production costs and a new contract for star Karl Malden, prompted ABC to cancel the series.

In the United Kingdom, The Streets of San Francisco debuted on November 19, 1973, on ITV.

Home media

Region 1 / Region 4
CBS DVD (distributed by Paramount) has released all five seasons of The Streets of San Francisco on DVD in Region 1, and the first two seasons in Region 4. All seasons have been released in two volume sets.

On May 9, 2017, CBS DVD released The Streets of San Francisco- The Complete series on DVD in Region 1.

Region 2
Paramount Home Entertainment has released the first two seasons of Streets of San Francisco on DVD in the UK.

References

External links 

  
 
 
 

1972 American television series debuts
1977 American television series endings
1970s American crime drama television series
1970s American mystery television series
1970s American police procedural television series
1970s American workplace drama television series
American Broadcasting Company original programming
American detective television series
Edgar Award-winning works
English-language television shows
Fictional portrayals of the San Francisco Police Department
Television shows based on American novels
Television series by Warner Bros. Television Studios
Television series by CBS Studios
Television shows set in San Francisco